By a Thread – Live in London 2011 is a 9-disc live album by the Devin Townsend Project, released on June 18, 2012, in Europe, and June 19, 2012, in North America. It includes live material recorded in November 2011, from four Devin Townsend Project concerts held in London, England. The idea of the live video compilation was revealed in March 2011 and detailed a year later.

Background and contents
The material for the box set was recorded at four Devin Townsend Project concerts, each entitled "An Evening with the Devin Townsend Project". Each concert featured one of the first four Devin Townsend Project albums performed in their entirety. The Ki, Addicted, and Deconstruction concerts were held at the University of London Union, and the Ghost concert was held at the Union Chapel.

The box set contains four DVDs, each featuring a concert, and four CDs containing the audio from the concerts. A fifth CD contains the audio of the encores played during the concerts. The box set is limited to 5,000 copies worldwide but remains available digitally.

Track listing

Ki
 "A Monday"
 "Coast"
 "Disruptr"
 "Gato"
 "Terminal"
 "Heaven's End"
 "Ain't Never Gonna Win"
 "Winter"
 "Trainfire"
 "Lady Helen"
 "Ki"
 "Quiet Riot"
 "Demon League"
 "Coast" (Take 2)
 "Synchronicity Freaks"
 "Deep Peace"

DVD 1 Extras:
Ki photo slide show
Devin commentary
"Coast" video

Addicted
 "Addicted!"
 "Universe in a Ball!"
 "Bend It Like Bender!"
 "Supercrush!"
 "Hyperdrive!"
 "Resolve!"
 "Ih-Ah!"
 "The Way Home!"
 "Numbered!"
 "Awake!"
 "Pixilate"
 "Life"
 "Kingdom"

DVD 2 Extras:
Addicted photo slide show
Devin's show commentary
"Bend It Like Bender" video

Deconstruction
 "Praise the Lowered"
 "Stand"
 "Juular"
 "Planet of the Apes"
 "Sumeria"
 "The Mighty Masturbator"
 "Pandemic"
 "Deconstruction"
 "Poltergeist"
 "Fake Punk"
 "Wallet Chain"
 "Metal Dilemma"

DVD 3 Extras:
Deconstruction photo slide show
Devin's show commentary
"Juular" video

Ghost
 "Fly"
 "Heart Baby" / "Saloon" (indexed separately on CD)
 "Feather"
 "Kawaii"
 "Ghost"
 "Blackberry"
 "Monsoon"
 "Texada"
 "Seams"
 "Infinite Ocean"
 "As You Were"
 "Fall"
 "Radial Highway"
 "Watch You"

DVD 4 Extras:
Ghost photo slide show
Devin's show commentary
"Kawaii" video
Ghost show day feature
By a Thread - interview
Barcode and Other Identifiers

Charts

References

Devin Townsend albums
2012 live albums
2012 video albums
Live video albums
Albums produced by Devin Townsend